The Oakland Golden Grizzlies baseball team is a varsity intercollegiate athletic team of Oakland University in Rochester, Michigan, United States. The team is a member of the Horizon League, which is part of the National Collegiate Athletic Association's Division I. The team plays its home games at Oakland University Baseball Field in Rochester, Michigan.

Oakland won the Great Lakes Intercollegiate Athletic Conference (GLIAC) league championship in 1978.

Head coaches 

Jacke Healey and Colin Kaline were named co-head coaches of the Oakland program on July 12, 2016. Healey was relieved of his duties as co-head coach in June, 2019. Kaline continued as the team's head coach. The team was coached solely be Kaline until his resignation in March 2020 due to health reasons. On May 29, 2020, Jordon Banfield was named the programs new head coach.

Major League Baseball
Oakland has had 18 Major League Baseball Draft selections since the draft began in 1965. Don Kirkwood one of the only 2 OU players to have played in Major League Baseball. He played for the California Angels, Chicago White Sox and Toronto Blue Jays from 1974 to 1978. The other is Mike Brosseau of the Tampa Bay Rays although he went undrafted he made his way to the pros in though the Rays farm system.

See also
List of NCAA Division I baseball programs

References

External links